Croatia–North Macedonia relations are foreign relations between Croatia and North Macedonia. Two countries established diplomatic relations on 30 March 1992. Croatia is represented in North Macedonia via its Embassy in Skopje and honorary consul in Strumica while North Macedonia is represented in Croatia via its Embassy and the Cultural and Informational Center in Zagreb as well as consulate in Rijeka and honorary consul in Zadar.
Croatia supports North Macedonia's European Union membership.
Before their independence in early 1990s, both countries were constituent republics of the Socialist Federal Republic of Yugoslavia as the SR Croatia and SR Macedonia respectively. Croatia was one of the first countries in the world to recognize the independence of the country during the period in which Zagreb itself awaited international recognition. During the long-lasting Macedonia naming dispute (1991-2019) and before the signature of the Prespa agreement Croatia was the first country in the world to recognize North Macedonia under its constitutional name of the Republic of Macedonia instead of appellation "the former Yugoslav Republic of Macedonia". Today, both countries are full members of the Council of Europe, and of the NATO. Croatia is an EU member and North Macedonia is an EU candidate. Since 2006 North Macedonia is a member state of the Central European Free Trade Agreement while Croatia was a member of the area between 2003 and 2013. Croatia strongly supports accession of North Macedonia to the European Union and also supported its NATO membership, being one of the first countries to ratify the membership protocol. Trade between the two countries reached 221 million euros in 2020.

In her 2013 analysis of Croatian relations with Western Balkans countries Senior Research Associate at the Institute for Development and International Relations in Zagreb Senada Šelo Šabić recognized that Croatian policy towards Macedonia is based on fostering good relations. Nevertheless, she also recognized insufficiencies of this approach in which in the case of any instability Zagreb would follow the official position of Brussels institutions instead of being an well informed link between the region and the EU capable of helping Brussels decision-making in prevention of possible escalation.

History 

During the existence of Kingdom of Yugoslavia extreme nationalist and fascist Croatian organization of Ustaše and pro-Bulgarian Internal Macedonian Revolutionary Organization collaborated in their disruptive and terrorist activities, most notoriously in the case of 1934 assassination of King of Yugoslavia Alexander I and French Foreign Minister Louis Barthou in Marseille during king's state visit to France. In 26 August 1936 at the University of Zagreb a group of Macedonian students belonging to the MANAPO signed the Political Declaration, an illegal document requesting political and social emancipation of Macedonians in the Kingdom of Yugoslavia.

Cultural and scientific cooperation 
The independent Section for Macedonian language and literature at the Department of South Slavic Languages of the Faculty of Humanities and Social Sciences, University of Zagreb was established in 1967/68.

See also 
 Foreign relations of Croatia
 Foreign relations of North Macedonia 
 Accession of North Macedonia to the European Union
 Macedonians of Croatia
 Croats of North Macedonia
 Agreement on Succession Issues of the Former Socialist Federal Republic of Yugoslavia

References

External links 
 Embassy of Croatia in North Macedonia
 The Chair of Macedonian Language and Literature, Faculty of Humanities and Social Sciences, University of Zagreb

 
North Macedonia
Croatia